This list of ecoregions in the United States provides an overview of United States ecoregions designated by the U.S. Environmental Protection Agency (EPA) and the Commission for Environmental Cooperation (CEC). The CEC was established in 1994 by the member states of Canada, Mexico, and the United States to address regional environmental concerns under the North American Agreement on Environmental Cooperation (NAAEC), the environmental side accord to the North American Free Trade Agreement (NAFTA). The Commission's 1997 report, Ecological Regions of North America, provides a framework that may be used by government agencies, non-governmental organizations, and academic researchers as a basis for risk analysis, resource management, and environmental study of the continent's ecosystems.  In the United States, the EPA and the United States Geological Survey (USGS) are the principal federal agencies working with the CEC to define and map ecoregions. Ecoregions may be identified by similarities in geology, physiography, vegetation, climate, soils, land use, wildlife distributions, and hydrology.

The classification system has four levels, but only Levels I and III are on this list. Level I divides North America into 15 broad ecoregions; of these, 12 lie partly or wholly within the United States. Fifty Level II regions were created to allow for a narrower delineation of Level I areas. Three level I areas were not subdivided for level 2. Level III subdivides the continent into 182 smaller ecoregions; of these, 104 lie partly or wholly with the United States. Level IV is a further subdivision of Level III ecoregions. Level IV mapping is still underway but is complete across most of the United States. For an example of Level IV data, see List of ecoregions in Oregon and the associated articles. The classification system excludes the U.S. state of Hawaii, which is not part of the North American continent.

Ecoregions in the United States

Marine West Coast Forest
 1 Coast Range
 2 Puget Lowland
 3 Willamette Valley
111 Ahklun Mountains and Kilbuck Mountains
113 Alaska Peninsula Mountains
 115 Cook Inlet
119 Pacific Coastal Mountains
120 Coastal Western Hemlock-Sitka Spruce Forests

The corresponding CEC ecoregion in Canada is called the Pacific Maritime Ecozone.

Western Forested Mountains
 4 Cascades
 5 Sierra Nevada
 9 Eastern Cascades Slopes and Foothills
 11 Blue Mountains
 15 Northern Rockies
16 Idaho Batholith
 17 Middle Rockies
 19 Wasatch and Uinta Mountains
 21 Southern Rockies
 41 Canadian Rockies
 77 North Cascades
 78 Klamath Mountains
 105 Interior Highlands
 116 Alaska Range
 117 Copper Plateau
 118 Wrangell Mountains

The corresponding CEC ecoregion in Canada is called the Montane Cordillera Ecozone.

Mediterranean California
 6 Southern and Central California Chaparral and Oak Woodlands
 7 Central California Valley
 8 Southern California Mountains

North American Deserts

 10 Columbia Plateau
 12 Snake River Plain
 13 Central Basin and Range
 14 Mojave Basin and Range
18 Wyoming Basin
20 Colorado Plateaus
22 Arizona/New Mexico Plateau
 24 Chihuahuan Deserts
 80 Northern Basin and Range
 81 Sonoran Basin and Range

Temperate Sierras
23 Arizona/New Mexico Mountains

Great Plains
25 Western High Plains
26 Southwestern Tablelands
27 Central Great Plains
 28 Flint Hills
 29 Central Oklahoma/Texas Plains
 30 Edwards Plateau
 31 Southern Texas Plains
40 Central Irregular Plains
42 Northwestern Glaciated Plains
43 Northwestern Great Plains
 44 Nebraska Sand Hills
46 Northern Glaciated Plains
47 Western Corn Belt Plains
48 Lake Agassiz Plain

The corresponding name in Canada for the same ecoregion is the Prairies Ecozone.

Eastern Temperate Forest
These forests stretch from the Southern Appalachians towards Canada, up to the northern Midwest. For a general description of these forests, refer to Temperate Deciduous Forest.  The standard reference is The Deciduous Forest of Eastern North America. The adjoining forests in Canada are generally referred to as the Mixedwood Plains Ecozone or the Great Lakes-St.Lawrence Forest Region.

 32 Texas Blackland Prairies
 33 East Central Texas Plains
 34 Western Gulf Coastal Plain
 36 Ouachita Mountains
 37 Arkansas Valley
 38 Boston Mountains
 39 Ozark Highlands
 51 North Central Hardwood Forests
 52 Driftless Area
 53 Southeastern Wisconsin Till Plains
 54 Central Corn Belt Plains
 55 Eastern Corn Belt Plains
 56 Southern Michigan/Northern Indiana Drift Plains
 57 Huron/Erie Lake Plains
 58 Northeastern Highlands
 59 Northeastern Coastal Zone
 60 Northern Appalachian Plateau and Uplands
 61 Erie Drift Plain
 64 Northern Piedmont
 66 Blue Ridge
 67 Ridge and Valley
 68 Southwestern Appalachians
 69 Central Appalachians
 70 Western Allegheny Plateau
 71 Interior Low Plateaus
 72 Interior River Valleys and Hills
 74 Mississippi Valley Loess Plains
 82 Laurentian Plains and Hills
 83 Eastern Great Lakes and Hudson Lowlands
 84 Atlantic Coastal Pine Barrens

Northern Forests
 49 Northern Minnesota Wetlands
 50 Northern Lakes and Forests
 58 Northeastern Highlands
 62 North Central Appalachians

The corresponding name in Canada for the same ecoregions are the Boreal Shield and the Atlantic Maritime Ecozones.

Tropical Wet Forests
 76 Southern Florida Coastal Plain

Southern Semi-Arid Highlands
 79 Madrean Archipelago

Taiga
 101 Arctic Coastal Plain
 102 Arctic Foothills
 103 Brooks Range
 104 Interior Forested Lowlands and Uplands
 106 Interior Bottomlands
 107 Yukon Flats
 108 Ogilvie Mountains

Temperate coniferous forest
 35 South Central Plains
 45 Piedmont
 63 Middle Atlantic Coastal Plain
 65 Southeastern Plains
 73 Mississippi Alluvial Plain
 74 Mississippi Valley Loess Plains
 75 Southern Coastal Plain

Tundra
 109 Subarctic Coastal Plains
 110 Seward Peninsula
 112 Bristol Bay-Nushagak Lowlands
 114 Aleutian Islands

Listings by state
 List of ecoregions in Illinois
 List of ecoregions in Indiana
 List of ecoregions in Minnesota
 List of ecoregions in Oregon
 List of ecoregions in Wisconsin

See also
 Ecoregions defined by the Commission for Environmental Cooperation and partner agencies:
 List of ecoregions in North America (CEC)
 Ecozones of Canada
 The conservation group World Wildlife Fund maintains an alternate classification system:
 List of terrestrial ecoregions (WWF)
 List of ecoregions in the United States (WWF)
 List of ecoregions in Canada (WWF)

References

External links
 State maps of US Level III Ecoregions (Select a state.  Then select "Level III Ecoregions")

United States EPA
 EPA
United States EPA
Natural history of the United States
United States EPA
Ecoregions, EPA
Ecoregions, EPA
Ecoregions, EPA